WHYU-FM (89.1 FM MHz) is a non-commercial radio station operated by the American Militia Association in Meyersdale, Pennsylvania. The station transferred from being a low-power FM station, to a full-power FM station in mid-August 2022.

The station claims to be the "only FCC licensed FM broadcast station operated by a militia-related organization in the United States".

On August 8, 2022, the American Militia Association surrendered the low-power station license for its former 102.3 FM frequency to the FCC, which cancelled it the same day as it transitioned to a full-power FM license at 89.1 FM. The full-power version of the station then went on the air on August 16.

References

External links 
 
 
 

Somerset County, Pennsylvania
HYU-FM
American Militia Association
American Militia Association
Radio stations established in 2017
2017 establishments in Pennsylvania